Ayotlan may refer to:
Ayotlán, a municipality in Jalisco.
Ayotlan (state) a pre-Spanish state in Mexico.